Richard E. Towers (born c. 1930) is a former American football player and coach and college athletics administrator. He was the 12th head football coach at Southern Illinois University Carbondale, serving for seven seasons, from 1967 to 1973, and compiling a record of 29–37–2. Towers was the athletic director at Kansas State University from 1981 to 1985. Iowa State associate athletic director 1986-1989. 

A native of Olathe, Kansas, Towers attended Kansas State University, where he played football as a halfback and ran track, competing in the half-mile and 400 metres hurdles.

Head coaching record

College

References

1930s births
Living people
American football halfbacks
American male hurdlers
American male middle-distance runners
Duke Blue Devils football coaches
Hutchinson Blue Dragons football coaches
Kansas State Wildcats athletic directors
Kansas State Wildcats football coaches
Kansas State Wildcats football players
Kansas State Wildcats men's track and field athletes
Southern Illinois Salukis football coaches
High school football coaches in Kansas
Sportspeople from Olathe, Kansas
Players of American football from Kansas
Track and field athletes from Kansas